Kalamantania whiteheadi is a species of air-breathing land snail, terrestrial pulmonate gastropod mollusks in the family Dyakiidae.

Kalamantania whiteheadi is the only species in the genus Kalamantania.

Description
This species was originally discovered and described as Helicarion (?) whiteheadi by Henry Haversham Godwin-Austen in 1891.

Godwin-Austen's original text (the type description) reads as follows:

Distribution
The type locality is Mount Kinabalu in Borneo.

See also
Biological classification

References

Dyakiidae
Gastropods described in 1891